Richard Colin Norwood (born 15 November 1986) is a British actor who played Fatboy in the soap opera EastEnders and its online spin-off EastEnders: E20. Ricky appeared on Celebrity Big Brother 18 in 2016, finishing as runner-up behind Ex on the Beach star Stephen Bear.

Early life
Norwood was born in Tower Hamlets, London, to a Kenyan Indian mother and English father. He lives in Wanstead.  From the age of 12 he attended the Theatre Royal Stratford East's Youth Theatre, and also studied Performing Arts at Barking College. With friends, Norwood started a production company, writing, producing and starring in five original productions which were performed at the Theatre Royal Stratford.

Career
Norwood's theatre credits include Daddy Cool (Shaftesbury Theatre), Sick (Almeida Theatre) and The Stones (Royal National Theatre). In 2009, Norwood was cast in the EastEnders internet spin-off series EastEnders: E20 as Fatboy. Norwood said of his casting: "I am so excited to be on the show. It's an honour to now be part of a show that has been on in my house for as long as I have been alive. I am born and bred in the East End—a stone's throw from the real Albert Square. It feels like a homecoming. I love being part of a cast that feels like family and can't wait to have a scene in The Vic." In the run-up to the series, Norwood also appeared in EastEnders for two episodes, and after EastEnders: E20 first series ended, Fatboy became a regular character in EastEnders. Fatboy was called one of the most popular new characters in the show and Norwood won Most Popular Newcomer at the 16th National Television Awards in 2011. Norwood went on to appear in series 2 and 3 of EastEnders: E20 as Fatboy, and has appeared in the spin-offs "East Street" and All I Want for Christmas. He has also appeared as a panellist on Pointless Celebrities and Sweat the Small Stuff. He took part in the 2013 Christmas special of Strictly Come Dancing, and was paired with professional dancer Janette Manrara.

On 30 March 2014 a video surfaced of Norwood reportedly smoking cannabis, and performing a sex act during a Skype chat, captured by a woman he had met online. On 1 April, after meeting with BBC and EastEnders bosses, he was suspended from the show for two months. An EastEnders spokesperson told Digital Spy: "Ricky Norwood has been suspended from the show for a period of two months with immediate effect. In addition, Ricky would like to apologise to EastEnders viewers for any offence caused and for bringing the show into disrepute." On 16 October 2015 it was announced Norwood had been axed from EastEnders after nearly six years in the role of Fatboy, after show bosses chose to write the character out. Norwood filmed his final scenes later that month and producers chose to keep details surrounding Fatboy's exit under wraps. A show spokesperson said, "We can confirm that Ricky will be leaving EastEnders. We wish him all the best for the future", whilst a show insider commented: "Ricky is a great guy and very popular on set. He's leaving the show as it's the end of Fatboy's storyline, but everyone wishes him well for the future." His last on-screen appearance was on 24 December 2015, and it transpired that the character was killed off-screen when crushed in the boot of a car.

Norwood's first role after leaving EastEnders was as a "vile, violent homophobe" in Marty Ross's audio drama Romeo and Jude, a gay adaptation of Romeo and Juliet.

Since 2016, Norwood has been a regular panellist on the Big Brother companion show Big Brother's Bit on the Side. He made several appearances in 2015 but more as a regular in 2016.

In July 2016, Norwood became a housemate on the eighteenth series of Celebrity Big Brother. He finished the series as runner-up behind Stephen Bear.

Filmography

Awards and nominations

References

External links

1986 births
Living people
English male soap opera actors
People from Forest Gate
English people of Kenyan descent
British male actors of Indian descent
British male actors of South Asian descent